"Star" is a song written by Joe Egan and performed by Stealers Wheel. In 1974, it reached #6 on the U.S. Adult Contemporary chart, #12 on the Canadian pop chart, #25 on the UK Singles Chart, and #29 on the U.S. pop chart. It was featured on the band's 1973 album Ferguslie Park.

The song was produced by Jerry Leiber and Mike Stoller.

Charts

Other versions
John Wesley Harding featuring Fastball released a version of the song on Harding's 2018 compilation album Greatest Other People's Hits.

References

1973 songs
1973 singles
Stealers Wheel songs
Fastball (band) songs
A&M Records singles